Nyssodrysternum colombianum is a species of beetle in the family Cerambycidae. It was described by Monne and Tavakilian in 2011.

References

Nyssodrysternum
Beetles described in 2011